Salvation Nell is a 1931 American Pre-Code drama film produced and directed by James Cruze and distributed by Tiffany Films, a company then on the brink of ceasing operations. The film is based on Edward Sheldon's 1908 Broadway play which starred Minnie Maddern Fiske and Holbrook Blinn.

Two silent versions were produced: in 1915 with Beatriz Michelena and in 1921 with Pauline Starke. Ralph Graves and Helen Chandler star in this film. Actor Matthew Betz appeared in both this film and the 1921 silent film. After years of being thought a lost film, a print was shown at a film festival in 2001.

Plot
Young Nell (Chandler) loses her job and home and her father is sent to prison. She joins the Salvation Army and tries to redeem him when he comes out of prison, bent on continuing his life of crime.

Cast
Ralph Graves as Jim Platt
Helen Chandler as Nell Saunders
Sally O'Neil as Myrtle
Jason Robards as Major Williams
DeWitt Jennings as McGovern
Charlotte Walker as Maggie
Matthew Betz as Mooney
Rose Dione as Madame Cloquette
Wally Albright as Jimmy

References

External links

1931 films
American black-and-white films
American films based on plays
Films based on works by Edward Sheldon
1931 drama films
Films directed by James Cruze
Tiffany Pictures films
1930s rediscovered films
Rediscovered American films
1930s English-language films
1930s American films